PS-120 Karachi West-IV is a constituency of the Provincial Assembly of Sindh.

General elections 2013

General elections 2008

See also
 PS-119 Karachi West-III
 PS-121 Karachi West-V

References

1. PS-93 Peshawar-II, National Assembly Election 2013 Results & Party Position (urdupoint.com)

External links
 Election commission Pakistan's official website
 Awazoday.com check result
 Official Website of Government of Sindh

Constituencies of Sindh